Jenny Tschernichin-Larsson (1867 – 15 June 1937) was a Swedish silent film actress. She appeared in more than 40 films between 1913 and 1933.

Selected filmography
 The Conflicts of Life (1913)
 The Miracle (1913)
 Judge Not (1914)
 A Good Girl Keeps Herself in Good Order (1914)
 Children of the Streets (1914)
 Daughter of the Peaks (1914)
 Hearts That Meet (1914)
 The Sea Vultures (1916)
 Kiss of Death (1916)
 Therèse (1916)
 The Outlaw and His Wife (1918)
 The Monastery of Sendomir (1920)
 A Wild Bird (1921)
 The Eyes of Love (1922)
 The Österman Brothers' Virago (1925)
 The Devil and the Smalander (1927)
 International Match (1932)
 A Stolen Waltz (1932)

References

External links

1867 births
1937 deaths
Swedish film actresses
Swedish silent film actresses
20th-century Swedish actresses
Actresses from Stockholm